The Voice of Midnight is a concept album by American art rock band The Residents, released in 2007. It was adapted from a short story, "Der Sandmann," by Prussian writer E. T. A. Hoffmann.

The protagonist of the story is Nathaniel (Nate) who carries a deep-seated fear that the childhood fable character, The Sandman, is stalking him.  Nate's fiancée, Claire is a steadfast realist.

The first 500 copies of the CD came with a five track bonus CD-EP The Sandman Waits. The original plan was for it to be the first 300, but so many people pre-ordered the recording that they boosted the print run.

Scenes

Actors
Nate: Corey Rosen
First worked with The Residents on River of Crime
Clair: Gerri Lawler
Worked on River of Crime as well as Tweedles.
Olympia (the other "woman," originally a robot): Carla Fabrizo
Long time Residents collaborator.
Other Characters: The Residents

Score Performed By
The Residents
Nolan Cook
Carla Fabrizo

References

Works based on The Sandman (short story)
The Residents albums
2007 albums
Mute Records albums